Fay Sampson (born 10 June 1935) is a British writer of speculative fiction, predominantly known for the Daughter of Tintagel, Pangur Ban, and Sorcerer fiction series.

Biography
Sampson earned a degree in mathematics in 1956 from the University College of the South West of England, now Exeter University. She taught at two English high schools, one in Mytholmroyd (1957–1958), and the other in Nottingham (1959–1960). She and her husband lived for a time in Rhodesia, where she ran a college library in Serenje from 1962 to 1964. After Rhodesia's independence and transition to Zambia, she moved back to Devon, and began writing children's novels.

Select bibliography

Daughter of Tintagel
A series of historical fantasy novels based on Morgan le Fay.
 Wise Woman's Telling (1989)
 White Nun's Telling (1989)
 Black Smith's Telling (1990)
 Taliesin's Telling (1991)
 Herself (1992)

Pangur Ban
Series of books based on the Old Irish poem, Pangur Bán.
 Pangur Ban, the White Cat (1983)
 Finnglas of the Horses (1985)
 Finnglas and the Stones of Choosing (1986)
 Shape Shifter - The Naming of Pangur Ban (1988)
 The Serpent of Senargad (1989)
 The White Horse Is Running (1990)

Sorcerer
 The Sorcerer's Trap (2005)
 The Sorcerer's Daughter (2007)

Standalone novels
 F.67 (1975)
 The Watch on Patterick Fell (1978)
 The Chains of Sleep (1981)
 Star Dancer (1993)
 Them (2003)

References

External links

 

Living people
1935 births
Writers from Plymouth, Devon
English science fiction writers
Women science fiction and fantasy writers
Writers of modern Arthurian fiction